Samuel Jacob Somerville (born 6 August 1994) is an English-born Malaysian professional footballer who plays as a goalkeeper for Malaysia Super League side Selangor and the Malaysia national team.

Career

Somerville started his career with English sixth division side Farnborough.

In 2012, he signed for Godalming Town in the English non-league. Later in 2015, Somerville moved to Malaysia, making his appearance in Malaysian League in the 2015 season, with Johor Darul Ta'zim brought in him along with other hybrid players such as Curran Ferns, Stuart Wark, Nick Swirad, Kevin Gunter and Daniel Ting.

For four seasons, Samuel Somerville played a lot for Johor Darul Ta’zim II in the Premier League and he won the 2019 Challenge Cup trophy before leaving the team where JDT II beat UKM FC in the final.

Before the 2020 season, Somerville signed for Malaysian club Penang after playing for the youth academy of Johor Darul Ta'zim II. Sam Somerville recorded four clean sheets in helping Penang win the 2020 Premier League and only conceded eight times in 11 matches. For the Super League this season, he has recorded three cleansheets in seven games.

Selangor

On 17 December 2021, Somerville switch sides to join Selangor for 2022 season.

International career

On 10 May 2021, Sam received a first call-up from Malaysia for the matches against Kuwait, Bahrain, United Arab Emirates, Vietnam and Thailand.

Honours

Godalming Town
Surrey Senior Cup: 2012–13

Johor Darul Ta'zim II
Malaysia Challenge Cup: 2019

Penang
Malaysia Premier League: 2020

References

External links
 
 Samuel Somerville at playmakerstats.com
 Sam Somerville at slough town fc official website
 Sam Somerville at fourfourtwo

Malaysian footballers
English footballers
English people of Malaysian descent
People from Farnborough, Hampshire
Expatriate footballers in Malaysia
Malaysia Super League players
Malaysia Premier League players
Association football goalkeepers
Living people
1994 births
Penang F.C. players
English expatriate footballers
English expatriate sportspeople in Malaysia
Farnborough F.C. players
Slough Town F.C. players
Godalming Town F.C. players
Tooting & Mitcham United F.C. players